The Ryom-Verzeichnis or Ryom Verzeichnis (both often abbreviated RV) is the standard catalogue of the music of Antonio Vivaldi created by Danish musicologist Peter Ryom.  Verzeichnis is the German word for catalogue. First published in 1973 under the title Antonio Vivaldi: Table de Concordances des Œuvres (RV), the Ryom-Verzeichnis has existed in several forms over the course of its development. The catalogue is often used to identify Vivaldi's works by a simple number.

RV numbers below 741 were assigned systematically, with vocal works following 585 instrumental ones; as additional works are discovered or confirmed, they are assigned numbers above 740. Instrumental works were first sorted by category, instrumentation and key (beginning with C Major), and then assigned sequential numbers. For example, Vivaldi's celebrated  Four Seasons, made up of four violin concertos (not sequentially numbered because they are in different keys), and his famous lute concerto are named and numbered as follows:

Concerto No. 1 in E major, Op. 8, RV 269 – "La primavera" (Spring)
Concerto No. 2 in G minor, Op. 8, RV 315 – "L'estate" (Summer)
Concerto No. 3 in F major, Op. 8, RV 293 – "L'autunno" (Autumn)
Concerto No. 4 in F minor, Op. 8, RV 297 – "L'inverno" (Winter)
Lute Concerto in D major, RV 93

Earlier catalogues of Vivaldi's work exist. There were, among others, the catalogues of Mario Rinaldi (published Rome, 1943) and Marc Pincherle (Paris, 1948). When the complete index of Antonio Fanna was finished (Milan, 1968), Ryom had already begun to work on his catalogue; therefore, a supplement appeared with Fanna's catalogue, containing previously unknown items that Ryom had discovered in the meantime. Fanna's catalogue, however, only includes instrumental works.

For the sake of concordance, the Ryom Verzeichnis provides reference to the numbers of Fanna (F.), Pincherle (P.), and Ricordi.

In July 2007 Peter Ryom appointed Italian musician Federico Maria Sardelli to continue his work of cataloguing the music of Antonio Vivaldi, and since then the latter has been responsible for the Ryom-Verzeichnis (RV).

See also 
List of compositions by Antonio Vivaldi
List of operas by Antonio Vivaldi
Opus number
Köchel catalogue

Notes

External links
 Repertoire des œuvres d'Antonio Vivaldi, vol. 1: Les Compositions instrumentales by Peter Ryom, review by Eleanor Selfridge-Field in Notes, 2nd Ser., Vol. 45, No. 1 (Sep., 1988), pp. 69–72
 Antonio Vivaldi: Thematisch-systematisches Verzeichnis seiner Werke (RV), by Peter Ryom (2007), review by Eleanor Selfridge-Field (2008) in "Notes", 2nd ser., Vol. 65, No. 2.
 List of Vivaldi's non-choral works put together by L. D. Lampson.
 Electronic Ryom-Verzeichnis (French interface but nonetheless easy to use)

Classical music catalogues